A school voucher, also called an education voucher in a voucher system, is a certificate of government funding for students at schools chosen by themselves or their parents. Funding is usually for a particular year, term, or semester. In some countries, states, or local jurisdictions, the voucher can be used to cover or reimburse home schooling expenses. In some countries, vouchers only exist for tuition at private schools.

A 2017 review of the economics literature on school vouchers concluded that "the evidence to date is not sufficient to warrant recommending that vouchers be adopted on a widespread basis; however, multiple positive findings support continued exploration".  A 2006 survey of members of the American Economic Association found that over two-thirds of economists support giving parents educational vouchers that can be used at both government-operated and private schools, and that support is greater if the vouchers are to be used by parents with low incomes or children in poorly performing schools.

History
When France lost the Franco-Prussian War (1870–1871) many blamed the loss on its inferior military education system. Following this defeat, the French Assembly proposed a religious voucher that they hoped would improve schools by allowing students to seek out the best. This proposal never moved forward due to the reluctance of the French to subsidize religious education. Despite its failure, this proposal closely resembles voucher systems proposed and used today in many countries.

The oldest extant school voucher programs in the United States are the Town Tuitioning programs in Vermont and Maine, beginning in 1869 and 1873 respectively. Because some towns in these states operate neither local high schools nor elementary schools, students in these towns "are eligible for a voucher to attend [either] public schools in other towns or non-religious private schools. In these cases, the 'sending' towns pay tuition directly to the 'receiving' schools".

A system of educational vouchers was introduced in the Netherlands in 1917. Today, more than 70% of pupils attend privately run but publicly funded schools, mostly split along denominational lines.

Milton Friedman argued for the modern concept of vouchers in the 1950s, stating that competition would improve schools, cost less and yield superior educational outcomes.  Friedman's reasoning in favor of vouchers gained additional attention in 1980 with the broadcast of his ten-part television series Free to Choose and the publication of its companion book of the same name (co-written with his wife Rose Friedman, who was also an economist). Episode 6 of the series and chapter 6 of the book were both entitled "What's Wrong with Our Schools", and asserted that permitting parents and students to use vouchers to choose their schools would expand freedom of choice and produce more well-educated students.

In some Southern states during the 1960s, school vouchers were used as a way to perpetuate segregation. In a few instances, public schools were closed outright and vouchers were issued to parents. The vouchers, known as tuition grants, in many cases, were only good at new, private and segregated schools, known as segregation academies.

Today, all modern voucher programs prohibit racial discrimination.

Definitions
There are important distinctions between different kinds of schools:
 Charter schools are funded publicly
 Education savings accounts (ESAs) allow parents to withdraw their children from public district or charter schools and receive a deposit of public funds into government-authorized savings accounts with restricted, but multiple, uses. Those funds, often distributed to families via debit card, can cover private school tuition and fees, online learning programs, private tutoring, community college costs, higher education expenses and other approved customized learning services and materials.
 Education tax credit, tuition tax credit, or tax-credit scholarship: There are two types of education tax credits: personal use, and donation.  Personal use tax credits are tax credits given to individual taxpayers for education expenditures made on behalf of their own children.  Donation tax credits are tax credits given to individual taxpayers or businesses who donate to non-profit organizations that give out private school scholarships.
 Open enrollment is the process of allowing parents to choose which public school their child attends instead of being assigned one (provided the school has not reached its maximum capacity number for students). This is sometimes confused with vouchers as a promotion for school choice.
 Private schools are funded privately, such as by tuition or donations.
 Public schools are funded by taxes (except in the United Kingdom, where the term 'public school' refers to older private schools, and the equivalent term for tax-funded schools is 'state school') 
 School vouchers are subsidies given directly to parents for tuition at any school

Economics

Background
Education as a tool for human capital accumulation is often crucial to the development and progression of societies and thus governments have large incentives to continually intervene and improve public education.  Additionally, education is often the tool with which societies instill a common set of values that underlie the basic norms of the society. Furthermore, there are positive externalities to society from education. These positive externalities can be in the form of reduced crime, more informed citizens and economic development, known as the neighborhood effect.

In terms of economic theory, families face a bundle of consumption choices that determine how much they will spend on education and private consumption. Any number of consumption bundles are available as long as they fit within the budget constraint. This means that any bundle of consumption of education and private consumption must not exceed budgetary constraints. Indifference curves represent the preferences of one good over another. The indifference curve determines how much education an individual will want to consume versus how much private consumption an individual will want to consume.

Government intervention in education typically takes two forms. The first approach can be broad, such as instituting charter schools, magnet schools, or for-profit schools and increasing competition. The second approach can be individually focused such as providing subsidies or loans for individuals to attend college or school vouchers for K-12.

Vouchers are typically instituted for two broad economic reasons.  The first reason is consumer choice. A family can choose to where their child goes to school and pick the school that is closest to their preference of education provider.

The second reason why vouchers are proposed is to increase market competition amongst schools. Similar to the free market theorem, vouchers are intended to make schools more competitive while lowering costs for schools and increasing the educational quality for consumers, the families.

In many instances where school voucher programs have been instituted, there have been mixed results, with some programs showing increased benefits of school vouchers and some instances showing detrimental effects.

Effects

Positive effects
A 2021 meta-analysis by Shakeel et al., published in the journal  School Effectiveness and School Improvement, evaluated evidence from randomized controlled trials assessing "student-level math and reading test score effects of school vouchers internationally." After evaluating 21 studies addressing 11 different voucher programs, the meta-analysis authors found "moderate evidence of positive achievement impacts of private school vouchers, with substantial effect heterogeneity across programs and outcome years" as well as evidence suggesting that "voucher interventions may be cost-effective even for null achievement impacts." The study authors noted that future experimental studies might yield more facts on whether and how "long-term, scaled-up voucher interventions" affect student achievement.

Negative effects
Besides the general lack of results, critics of school vouchers argue that vouchers will lead to segregation. Empirical studies show that there is some evidence that school vouchers can lead to racial or income segregation. However research on this topic is inconclusive, as there is also valid research that shows under certain circumstances, income and racial segregation can be reduced indirectly by increasing school choice.

Additionally, since school vouchers are funded by the government, the implementation could cause the funds for public schools to be reduced. Private-school vouchers affect government budgets through two channels: additional direct voucher expenditures, and public school cost savings from lower enrollments. Voucher programs would be paid for by the government's education budget, which would be subtracted from the public school's budget. This might affect the public school system by giving them less to spend and use for their student's education.

A 2018 study by Abdulkadiroğlu et al. found that disadvantaged students who won a lottery (the Louisiana Scholarship Program) to get vouchers to attend private schools had worse education outcomes than disadvantaged students who did not win vouchers: "LSP participation lowers math scores by 0.4 standard deviations and also reduces achievement in reading, science, and social studies. These effects may be due in part to selection of low-quality private schools into the program".

Implementations

Colombia
The PACES voucher program was established by the Colombian government in late 1991. It aimed to assist low-income households by distributing school vouchers to students living in neighborhoods situated in the two lowest socioeconomic strata. Between 1991 and 1997, the PACES program awarded 125,000 vouchers to lower-income secondary school students. Those vouchers were worth about US$190 in 1998, and data shows that matriculation fees and other monthly expenses incurred by voucher students attending private schools averaged about US$340 in 1998, so a majority of voucher recipients supplemented the voucher with personal funds.

The students selected to be in the program were selected by lottery. The vouchers were able to be renewed annually, conditional on students achieving satisfactory academic success as indicated by scheduled grade promotion. The program also included incentives to study harder as well as widening schooling options. Empirical evidence showed that the program had some success. Joshua Angrist shows that after three years into the program, lottery winners were 15 percentage points more likely to attend private school and complete 0.1 more years of schooling, and were about 10 percentage points more likely to have finished the 8th grade. The study also reported that there were larger voucher effects for boys than for girls, especially in mathematics performance. It is important to note that the program did not have a significant impact on dropout rates. Angrist reports that lottery winners scored 0.2 standard deviations higher on standardized tests. The voucher program also reported some social effects. Lottery winners worked less on average than non-lottery winners. Angrist reports that this was correlated with a decreased likelihood to marry or cohabit as teenagers.

Chile
In 1981, Chile implemented a universal school voucher system for both elementary and secondary school students. As a result, over 1,000 private schools entered the market, and private enrollment increased by 20–40% by 1998, surpassing 50% in some urban areas. From 1981 to 1988, the private school enrollment rate in urban areas grew 11% more than the private school enrollment rate in rural areas. This change coincided with the transfer of public school administration from the central government to local municipalities. The financial value of a voucher did not depend on the income of the family receiving it, and the program allowed private voucher schools to be selective, while public schools had to accept and enroll every interested student. At the turn of the 21st century, student achievement in Chile was low compared to students in other nations based on international test scores. This disparity led to the Chilean government enacting substantial educational reforms in 2008, including major changes in the school voucher system.

The Chilean government passed the Preferential School Subsidy Law (SEP) in January 2008. This piece of legislation made the educational voucher system much more like the regulated compensatory model championed by Christopher Jencks. Under SEP, the voucher system was altered to take family incomes into account. The vouchers provided to "priority students" – those whose family income was in the lower than 40% of Chileans – were worth 50% more than those given to the families with higher income. Schools with larger numbers of priority students were eligible to receive per-student bonuses, the size of which was tied to the percentage of priority students in the student body. When SEP was started, it covered preschool to fourth grade, and an additional school year of coverage was added each subsequent year. Almost every public school chose to participate in SEP in 2008, as well as almost two-thirds of private subsidized elementary schools.

There were three important requirements attached to the program. The first requirement stipulated that participating schools could not charge fees to priority students, although private schools in the voucher system could do so for non-priority students. The second requirement ensured that schools could not select students based on their academic ability, nor expel them on academic grounds. The third requirement postulated that schools had to self-enroll themselves in an accountability system that ensured that schools were responsible for the utilization of financial resources and student test scores.

Europe
In most European countries, education for all primary and secondary schools is fully subsidized. In some countries (e.g. Belgium or France), parents are free to choose which school their child attends.

France

Parents can choose either a private school or a public school.  Most private schools are under contract to the French government in which case the French government pays teachers' salaries and they are considered state employees.  Other costs at private schools are paid through fees which are usually low. Schools under contract follow the French national curriculum.  Some private schools are not under contract giving them more freedom to teach different curricula although the state still monitors educational standards. Teachers' salaries at private schools not 'under contract' are paid through fees that are therefore much higher than those under contract. About 20% of French schoolchildren attend private schools. Homeschooling is heavily restricted in France.

Ireland

Most schools in the Republic of Ireland are state-aided Catholic parish schools, established under diocesan patronage but with capital costs, teachers' salaries, and a fee per head paid to the school. These are given to the school regardless of whether or not it requires its students to pay fees. (Although fee-paying schools are in the minority, there has been much criticism over the state aid they receive. Opponents claim that the aid gives them an unfair advantage.)

There is a recent trend towards multi-denominational schools established by parents and organised as limited companies without share capital. Parents and students are free to choose their own schools. If a school fails to attract students, it immediately loses its fees and eventually loses its teaching posts, and teachers are moved to other schools that are attracting students. The system is perceived to have achieved very successful outcomes for most Irish children.

The 1995–97 "Rainbow Coalition" government, containing ministers from parties of the center-right and the left, introduced free third-level education to primary degree level. Critics charge that this has not increased the number of students from economically deprived backgrounds attending university. However, studies have shown that the removal of tuition fees at third level has increased the numbers of students overall and of students from lower socioeconomic backgrounds. Since the economic crisis of 2008, there has been extensive debate regarding the possible reintroduction of third-level fees.

Sweden

In Sweden, a system of school vouchers (called skolpeng) was introduced in 1992 at primary and secondary school level, enabling free choice among publicly run schools and privately run friskolor ("free schools"). The voucher is paid with public funds from the local municipality (kommun) directly to a school based solely on its number of students. Both public schools and free schools are funded the same way. Free schools can be run by not-for-profit groups as well as by for-profit companies, but may not charge top-up fees or select students other than on a first-come, first-served basis. Over 10% of Swedish pupils were enrolled in free schools in 2008 and the number is growing fast, leading the country to be viewed as a pioneer of the model.

Per Unckel, governor of Stockholm and former Minister of Education, has promoted the system, saying "Education is so important that you can't just leave it to one producer, because we know from monopoly systems that they do not fulfill all wishes." The Swedish system has been recommended to Barack Obama by some commentators, including the Pacific Research Institute, which has released a documentary called Not As Good As You Think: Myth of the Middle Class Schools, a movie depicting positive benefits for middle class schools resulting from Sweden's voucher programs.

A 2004 study concluded that school results in public schools improved due to increased competition. However, Per Thulberg, director general of the Swedish National Agency for Education, has said that the system "has not led to better results" and in the 2000s Sweden's ranking in the PISA league tables worsened.  Though Rachel Wolf, director of the New Schools Network, has suggested that Sweden's education standards had slipped for reasons other than as a result of free schools.

A 2015 study was able to show that "an increase in the share of independent school students improves average short‐ and long‐run outcomes, explained primarily by external effects (e.g. school competition)".

Hong Kong
A voucher system for children three to six years old who attend a non-profit kindergarten was implemented in Hong Kong in 2007. Each child will get HK$13,000 per year. The $13,000 subsidy will be separated into two parts. $10,000 is used to subsidize the school fee and the remaining $3,000 is used for kindergarten teachers to pursue further education and obtain a certificate in Education. Also, there are some restrictions on the voucher system. Parents can only choose non-profit schools with a yearly fee of less than $24,000. The government hoped that all kindergarten teachers can obtain an Education certificate by the year 2011–12, at which point the subsidies are to be adjusted to $16,000 for each student, all of which will go toward the school fee.

Milton Friedman criticised the system, saying "I do not believe that CE Mr. Tsang's proposal is properly structured." He said that the whole point of a voucher system is to provide a competitive marketplace so should not be limited to non-profit kindergartens. 

After protests by parents with children enrolled in for-profit kindergartens, the program was extended to children in for-profit kindergartens, but only for children enrolled in or before September 2007. The government will also provide up to HK$30,000 subsidy to for-profit kindergartens wanting to convert to non-profit.

Pakistan

In Pakistani Punjab, the Education Voucher Scheme (EVS) was introduced by Dr. Allah Bakhsh Malik Managing Director and Chief Executive of Punjab Education Foundation (PEF), especially in urban slums and the poorest of the poor in 2005. The initial study was sponsored by Open Society Institute New York USA. Professor Henry M. Levin extended Pro-Bono services for children of poor families from Punjab. To ensure educational justice and integration, the government must ensure that the poorest families have equal access to quality education. The voucher scheme was designed by the Teachers College, Columbia University, and the Open Society Institute. It aims to promote freedom of choice, efficiency, equity, and social cohesion.

A pilot project was started in 2006 in the urban slums of Sukhnehar, Lahore, where a survey showed that all households lived below the poverty line. Through the EVS, the foundation would deliver education vouchers to every household with children 5–16 years of age. The vouchers would be redeemable against tuition payments at participating private schools. In the pilot stage, 1,053 households were given an opportunity to send their children to a private school of their choice. The EVS makes its partner schools accountable to the parents rather than to the bureaucrats at the Ministry of Education. In the FAS program, every school principal has the choice to admit a student or not. However, in the EVS, a partner school cannot refuse a student if the student has a voucher and the family has chosen that school. The partner schools are also accountable to the PEF: they are subject to periodic reviews of their student learning outcomes, additional private investments, and improvements in the working conditions of the teachers. The EVS provides an incentive to parents to send their children to school, and so it has become a source of competition among private schools seeking to join the program.

When it comes to the selection of schools, the following criteria are applied across the board: (i) The fee paid by the PEF to EVS partner schools is PKR 550 per child per month. Schools charging higher fees can also apply to the program, but they will not be paid more than PKR 1200, and they will not be entitled to charge the difference to students' families. (ii) Total school enrollment should be at least 50 children.  (iii) The school should have adequate infrastructure and a good learning environment. (iv) EVS partner schools should be located within a half-kilometer radius of the residences of voucher holders. However, if the parents prefer a particular school farther away, the PEF will not object, provided that the school fulfills the EVS selection criteria. (v) The PEF advertises to stimulate the interest of potential partner schools. It then gives students at short-listed schools preliminary tests in selected subjects and conducts physical inspections of these schools. PEF offices display a list of all the EVS partner schools so that parents may consult it and choose a school for their children.

By now more than 500,000 students are benefiting from EVS and the program is being scaled up by financing from the Government of Punjab.

School voucher public policy in the United States

In the 1980s, the Reagan administration pushed for vouchers, as did the George W. Bush administration in the initial education reform proposals leading up to the No Child Left Behind Act. As of December 2016, 14 states had traditional school voucher programs. These states consist of: Arkansas, Florida, Georgia, Indiana, Louisiana, Maine, Maryland, Mississippi, North Carolina, Ohio, Oklahoma, Utah, Vermont, and Wisconsin. The capital of the United States, Washington, D.C., also had operating school voucher programs as of December 2016.  When including scholarship tax credits and education savings accounts – two alternatives to vouchers – there are 27 states plus the District of Columbia with private school choice programs. Most of these programs were offered to students in low-income families, low-performing schools, or students with disabilities. By 2014, the number participating in either vouchers or tax-credit scholarships increased to 250,000, a 30% increase from 2010, but still a small fraction compared to the 55 million in traditional schools.

In 1990, the city of Milwaukee, Wisconsin's public schools was the first to offer vouchers and has nearly 15,000 students using vouchers as of 2011. The program, entitled the Milwaukee Parental Choice Program, originally funded school vouchers for nonreligious, private institutions. It was, however, eventually expanded to include private, religious institutions after it saw success with nonreligious, private institutions. The 2006/07 school year marked the first time in Milwaukee that more than $100 million was paid in vouchers. Twenty-six percent of Milwaukee students will receive public funding to attend schools outside the traditional Milwaukee Public School system. In fact, if the voucher program alone were considered a school district, it would mark the sixth-largest district in Wisconsin.  St. Anthony Catholic School, located on Milwaukee's south side, boasts 966 voucher students, meaning that it very likely receives more public money for general school support of a parochial elementary or high school than any before it in American history. A 2013 study of Milwaukee's program posited that the use of vouchers increased the probability that a student would graduate from high school, go to college, and stay in college. A 2015 paper published by the National Bureau of Economic Research found that participation in Louisiana's voucher program "substantially reduces academic achievement" although that the result may be reflective of the poor quality of private schools in the program.

A recent analysis of the competitive effects of school vouchers in Florida suggests that more competition improves performance in the regular public schools.

The largest school voucher program in the United States is the Indiana Choice Scholarships program.

Proponents
Proponents of school vouchers and education tax credit systems argue that those systems promote free market competition among both private and public schools by allowing parents and students to choose the school to use the vouchers. This choice available to parents forces schools to perpetually improve in order to maintain enrollment. Thus, proponents argue that a voucher system increases school performance and accountability because it provides consumer sovereignty – allowing individuals to choose what product to buy, as opposed to a bureaucracy.

This argument is supported by studies such as "When Schools Compete: The Effects of Vouchers on Florida Public School Achievement" (Manhattan Institute for Policy Research, 2003), which concluded that public schools located near private schools that were eligible to accept voucher students made significantly more improvements than did similar schools not located near eligible private schools. Stanford's Caroline Hoxby, who has researched the systemic effects of school choice, determined that areas with greater residential school choice have consistently higher test scores at a lower per-pupil cost than areas with very few school districts. Hoxby studied the effects of vouchers in Milwaukee and of charter schools in Arizona and Michigan on nearby public schools. Public schools forced to compete made greater test-score gains than schools not faced with such competition, and that the so-called effect of cream skimming did not exist in any of the voucher districts examined. Hoxby's research has found that both private and public schools improved through the use of vouchers.

Similarly, it is argued that such competition has helped in higher education, with publicly funded universities directly competing with private universities for tuition money provided by the Government, such as the GI Bill and the Pell Grant in the United States. The Foundation for Educational Choice alleges that a school voucher plan "embodies exactly the same principle as the GI bills that provide for educational benefits to military veterans. The veteran gets a voucher good only for educational expense and he is completely free to choose the school at which he uses it, provided that it satisfies certain standards". The Pell Grant, a need-based aid, like the Voucher, can only be used for authorized school expenses at qualified schools, and, like the Pell, the money follows the student, for use against those authorized expenses (not all expenses are covered).

Proponents are encouraged by private school sector growth, as they believe that private schools are typically more efficient at achieving results at a much lower per-pupil cost than public schools. A CATO Institute study of public and private school per pupil spending in Phoenix, Los Angeles, D.C., Chicago, New York City, and Houston found that public schools spend 93% more than the estimated median private schools.

Proponents claim that institutions often are forced to operate more efficiently when they are made to compete and that any resulting job losses in the public sector would be offset by the increased demand for jobs in the private sector.

Friedrich von Hayek on the privatizing of education:

Other notable supporters include New Jersey Senator Cory Booker, former Governor of South Carolina Mark Sanford, billionaire and American philanthropist John T. Walton, Former Mayor of Baltimore Kurt L. Schmoke,  Former Massachusetts Governor Mitt Romney and John McCain. A random survey of 210 Ph.D. holding members of the American Economic Association, found that over two-thirds of economists support giving parents educational vouchers that can be used at government-operated or privately operated schools, and that support is greater if the vouchers are to be used by parents with low-incomes or parents with children in poorly performing schools.

Another prominent proponent of the voucher system was Apple co-founder and CEO, Steve Jobs, who said:

As a practical matter, proponents note, most U.S. programs only offer poor families the same choice more affluent families already have, by providing them with the means to leave a failing school and attend one where the child can get an education. Because public schools are funded on a per-pupil basis, the money simply follows the child, but the cost to taxpayers is less because the voucher generally is less than the actual cost.

In addition, they say, the comparisons of public and private schools on average are meaningless. Vouchers usually are utilized by children in failing schools, so they can hardly be worse off even if the parents fail to choose a better school. Also, focusing on the effect on public school suggests that is more important than the education of children.

Some proponents of school vouchers, including the Sutherland Institute and many supporters of the Utah voucher effort, see it as a remedy for the negative cultural impact caused by underperforming public schools, which falls disproportionately on demographic minorities. During the run-up to the November referendum election, Sutherland issued a controversial publication: Voucher, Vows, & Vexations. Sutherland called the publication an important review of the history of education in Utah, while critics just called it revisionist history.  Sutherland then released a companion article in a law journal as part of an academic conference about school choice.

EdChoice, founded by Milton and Rose Friedman in 1996, is a non-profit organization that promotes universal school vouchers and other forms of school choice. In defense of vouchers, it cites empirical research showing that students who were randomly assigned to receive vouchers had higher academic outcomes than students who applied for vouchers but lost a random lottery and did not receive them; and that vouchers improve academic outcomes at public schools, reduce racial segregation, deliver better services to special education students, and do not drain money from public schools.

EdChoice also argues that education funding should belong to children, not a specific school type or building. Their purpose for the argument is to try to argue that people should prioritize a student's education and their opportunity over making a specific type of school better. They also emphasize that if a family chooses a public school, the funds also go to that school. This would mean that it would also benefit those who value the public education system.

Opponents
The main critique of school vouchers and education tax credits is that they put public education in competition with private education, threatening to reduce and reallocate public school funding to private schools. Opponents question the belief that private schools are more efficient.

Public school teachers and teacher unions have also fought against school vouchers. In the United States, public school teacher unions, most notably the National Education Association (the largest labor union in the US), argue that school vouchers erode educational standards and reduce funding and that giving money to parents who choose to send their child to a religious or other school is unconstitutional. The latter issue was struck down by the Supreme Court case Zelman v. Simmons-Harris, which upheld Ohio's voucher plan in a 5–4 ruling. In contrast, the use of public school funding for vouchers to private schools was disallowed by the Louisiana Supreme Court in 2013. The Louisiana Supreme Court did not declare vouchers unconstitutional, just the use of money earmarked for public schools via the Louisiana Constitution for funding Louisiana's voucher program.  The National Education Association also points out that access to vouchers is just like "a chance in a lottery" where parents had to be lucky in order to get a space in this program. Since almost all students and their families would like to choose the best schools, those schools, as a result, quickly reach its maximum capacity number for students that state law permits. Those who did not get vouchers then have to compete again to look for some other less preferred and competitive schools or give up searching and go back to their assigned local schools. Jonathan Kozol, a prominent public school reform thinker and former public school teacher called vouchers the "single worst, most dangerous idea to have entered education discourse in my adult life".

The National Education Association additionally argues that more money should go towards public education to help the schools struggling and improve the schools overall, instead of reducing the public school's fund to go towards school vouchers. Their argument claims that increasing that amount of money that goes towards public education would also increase the amount of resources put into public schools, therefore, improving the education. This argument made towards school vouchers reflects the way the organization values public education. For example, in an interview in May 2017 regarding Donald Trump's 2018 Budget Proposal, the organization's president, Lily Eskelsen García, claimed:

"We should invest in what makes schools great, the things that build curiosity and instill a love of learning. That is what every student deserves and what every parent wants for his or her child. It should not depend on how much their parents make, what language they speak at home, and certainly, not what neighborhood they live in." – National Education Association President Lily Eskelsen García.

Furthermore, there are multiple studies that support the arguments made by opponents of school vouchers. One of these studies, conducted by the Tulane University's Education Research Alliance, consists of observing the relationship between voucher programs and students' test scores. They found that students in the Louisiana voucher program initially had lower test scores, but after three years, their scores matched those of students who stayed in public schools from standardized test scores spanning from 2012 to 2015.

People who can benefit from vouchers may not know it. In April 2012, a bill passed in Louisiana that made vouchers available to low-income families whose children attended poorly-ranked schools. A student whose household income was low (up to about $44,000 for a family of three) and who attended a school ranked "C", "D", or "F" could apply for vouchers to attend another.  Of the estimated 380,000 eligible students during the school year when the bill was passed (2012/13), only 5,000 students knew about and applied for the vouchers, and accepted them.

In 2006, the United States Department of Education released a report concluding that average test scores for reading and mathematics, when adjusted for student and school characteristics, tend to be very similar among public schools and private schools.  Private schools performed significantly better than public schools only if results were not adjusted for factors such as race, gender, and free or reduced-price lunch program eligibility. Other research questions assumptions that large improvements would result from a more comprehensive voucher system.

Given the limited budget for schools, it is claimed that a voucher system would weaken public schools while not providing enough money for people to attend private schools. 76% of the money given in Arizona's voucher program went to children already in private schools.

Some sources claim that public schools' higher per-pupil spending is due to having a higher proportion of students with behavioral, physical, and emotional problems since in the United States, public schools must by law accept any student regardless of race, gender, religion, disability, educational aptitude, and so forth, while private schools are not so bound.  They argue that some, if not all, of the cost difference between public and private schools comes from "cream skimming", whereby the private schools select only those students who belong to a preferred group – whether economic, religious, educational aptitude level, or ethnicity – rather than from differences in administration.  The result, it has been argued, is that a voucher system has led or would lead students who do not belong to the private schools' preferred groupings to become concentrated at public schools. However, of the ten state-run voucher programs in the United States at the beginning of 2011, four targeted low-income students, two targeted students in failing schools, and six targeted students with special needs. (Louisiana ran a single program targeting all three groups.)

It is also argued that voucher programs are often implemented without the necessary safeguards that prevent institutions from discriminating against marginalized communities. In the United States, as of 2016, there are currently no state laws that require voucher programs to not discriminate against marginalized communities. Further, while some voucher programs may explicitly be aimed at marginalized communities, this is not necessarily always the case. A common argument for school vouchers is that it allows for marginalized communities of color to be uplifted from poverty. Historically, however, data suggests that voucher programs have been used to further segregate Americans. Further, some data has shown that the effects of voucher programs such as the New York City School Choice Scholarship Program, are marginal when it comes to increasing student achievement.

Another argument against a school voucher system is its lack of accountability to taxpayers. In many states, members of a community's board of education are elected by voters. Similarly, a school budget faces a referendum. Meetings of the Board of Education must be announced in advance, and members of the public are permitted to voice their concerns directly to board members. By contrast, although vouchers may be used in private and religious schools, taxpayers cannot vote on budget issues, elect members of the board or even attend board meetings. Even voucher proponents acknowledge that decreased transparency and accountability for public funds are problematic features of the voucher system, and some have suggested a 'sliding scale' approach wherein oversight and accountability increase in proportion to the number of taxpayer dollars (in the form of vouchers) received by the private school.

Kevin Welner points out that vouchers funded through a convoluted tax credit system – a policy he calls "neovouchers" – present additional accountability concerns. With neovoucher systems, a taxpayer owing money to the state instead donates that money to a private, nonprofit organization. That organization then bundles donations and gives them to parents as vouchers to be used for private school tuition. The state then steps in and forgives (through a tax credit) some or all of the taxes that the donor has given to the organization. While conventional tax credit systems are structured to treat all private school participants equally, neovoucher systems effectively delegate to individual private taxpayers (those owing money to the state) the power to decide which private schools will benefit.

An example of a lack of accountability is the voucher situation in Louisiana. In 2012,  Louisiana State Superintendent of Education John White selected private schools to receive vouchers, then tried to fabricate criteria (including site visits) after schools had already received approval letters. One school of note, New Living Word in Ruston, Louisiana, did not have sufficient facilities for the over 300 students White and the state board of education had approved. Following a voucher audit in 2013, New Living Word had overcharged the state $395,000. White referred to the incident as a "lone substantive issue". However, most voucher schools did not undergo a complete audit for not having a separate checking account for state voucher money.

According to Susanne Wiborg, an expert on comparative education, Sweden's voucher system introduced in 1992 has "augmented social and ethnic segregation, particularly in relation to schools in deprived areas".

Tax-credit scholarships which are in most part disbursed to current private school students or to families which made substantial donations to the scholarship fund, rather than to low-income students attempting to escape from failing schools, amount to nothing more than a mechanism to use public funds in the form of foregone taxes to support private, often religiously based, private schools.

Legal challenges
The school voucher question in the United States also received a considerable amount of judicial review in the early 2000s.

A program launched in the city of Cleveland in 1995 and authorized by the state of Ohio was challenged in court on the grounds that it violated both the federal constitutional principle of separation of church and state and the guarantee of religious liberty in the Ohio Constitution. These claims were rejected by the Ohio Supreme Court, but the federal claims were upheld by the local federal district court and by the Sixth Circuit appeals court. The fact that nearly all of the families using vouchers attended Catholic schools in the Cleveland area was cited in the decisions.

This was later reversed in 2002 in a landmark case before the US Supreme Court, Zelman v. Simmons-Harris, in which the divided court, in a 5–4 decision, ruled the Ohio school voucher plan constitutional and removed any constitutional barriers to similar voucher plans in the future, with conservative justices Anthony Kennedy, Sandra Day O'Connor, William Rehnquist, Antonin Scalia, and Clarence Thomas in the majority.

Chief Justice William Rehnquist, writing for the majority, stated that "The incidental advancement of a religious mission, or the perceived endorsement of a religious message, is reasonably attributable to the individual aid recipients, not the government, whose role ends with the disbursement of benefits." The Supreme Court ruled that the Ohio program did not violate the Establishment Clause, because it passed a five-part test developed by the Court in this case, titled the Private Choice Test.

Dissenting opinions included Justice Stevens's, who wrote "...the voluntary character of the private choice to prefer a parochial education over an education in the public school system seems to me quite irrelevant to the question whether the government's choice to pay for religious indoctrination is constitutionally permissible" and Justice Souter's, whose opinion questioned how the Court could keep Everson v. Board of Education on as precedent and decide this case in the way they did, feeling it was contradictory. He also found that religious instruction and secular education could not be separated and this itself violated the Establishment Clause. 

In 2006, the Florida Supreme Court struck down legislation known as the Florida Opportunity Scholarship Program (OSP), which would have implemented a system of school vouchers in Florida. The court ruled that the OSP violated article IX, section 1(a) of the Florida Constitution: "Adequate provision shall be made by law for a uniform, efficient, safe, secure, and high-quality system of free public schools." This decision was criticized by Clark Neily, Institute for Justice senior attorney and  legal counsel to Pensacola families using Florida Opportunity Scholarships, as "educational policymaking".

Political support
Political support for school vouchers in the United States is mixed. On the left/right spectrum, conservatives are more likely to support vouchers. Some state legislatures have enacted voucher laws.  In New Mexico, then-Republican Gary Johnson made school voucher provision the major issue of his second term as governor. As of 2006, the federal government operates the largest voucher program, for evacuees from the region affected by Hurricane Katrina. The federal government provided a voucher program for 7,500 residents of Washington, D.C., called the D.C. Opportunity Scholarship Program. The program operated until in early March 2009, when congressional Democrats moved to close down the program and remove children from their voucher-funded school places at the end of the 2009/10 school year under the $410 billion Omnibus Appropriations Act of 2009 which, as of March 7 had passed the House and was pending in the Senate. The Obama administration stated that it preferred to allow children already enrolled in the program to finish their schooling while closing the program to new entrants.  However, its preference on this matter was not strong enough to prevent the president from signing the bill.

Whether or not the public generally supports vouchers is debatable. Majorities seem to favor improving existing schools over providing vouchers, yet as many as 40% of those surveyed admit that they do not know enough to form an opinion or do not understand the system of school vouchers.

In November 2000, a voucher system proposed by Tim Draper was placed on the California ballot as Proposition 38. It was unusual among school voucher proposals in that it required neither accreditation on the part of schools accepting vouchers, nor proof of need on the part of families applying for them; neither did it have any requirement that schools accept vouchers as payment-in-full, nor any other provision to guarantee a reduction in the real cost of private school tuition. The measure was defeated by a final percentage tally of 70.6 to 29.4.

A statewide universal school voucher system providing a maximum tuition subsidy of $3,000 was passed in Utah in 2007, but 62% of voters repealed it in a statewide referendum before it took effect. On April 27, 2011 Indiana passed a statewide voucher program, the largest in the U.S. It offers up to $4,500 to students with household incomes under $41,000, and lesser benefits to households with higher incomes. The vouchers can be used to fund a variety of education options outside the public school system. In March 2013, the Indiana Supreme Court found that the program does not violate the state constitution.

Trump's 2018 Budget 
President Donald Trump proposed a 2018 budget that included $250 million for voucher initiatives, state-funded programs that pay for students to go to private school. This 2018 budget served the purpose of "Expanding school choice, ensuring more children have an equal opportunity to receive a great education, maintaining strong support for the Nation's most vulnerable students, simplifying funding for post-secondary education, continuing to build evidence around educational innovation, and eliminating or reducing Department programs consistent with the limited Federal role in education." The Budget reduced more than 30 programs that duplicated other programs; that were deemed ineffective; or that were more appropriately supported with state, local, or private funds. Another $1 billion was set aside for encouraging schools to adopt school choice-friendly policies.

Betsy DeVos, Trump's education secretary, is also an advocate for voucher programs and has argued that they would lead to better educational outcomes for students. Both Trump and DeVos proposed cutting the Education Department's budget by about $3.6 billion and spend more than $1 billion on private school vouchers and other school choice plans.

Regarding the purpose and importance of the budget, DeVos claimed:

This budget makes an historic investment in America's students. President Trump is committed to ensuring the Department focuses on returning decision-making power back to the States, where it belongs, and on giving parents more control over their child's education. By refocusing the Department's funding priorities on supporting students, we can usher in a new era of creativity and ingenuity and lay a new foundation for American greatness. – Betsy DeVos, U.S. Secretary of Education

Teaching creationism instead of evolution
Some private religious schools in voucher programs teach creationism instead of the theory of evolution, including religious schools that teach religious theology side by side with or in place of science.  Over 300 schools in the U.S. have been documented as teaching creationism and receiving taxpayer money. Contrary to popular belief , a strict definition of state-funded religious education was narrowly deemed constitutional in Zelman v. Simmons-Harris (2002). At least 35 states have passed various Blaine Amendments restricting or prohibiting public funding of religious education. However, Espinoza v. Montana Department of Revenue (2020) ruled that it is unconstitutional to disqualify all religious schools from receiving public funds that other private schools are eligible to get.

See also 

 Scholarship
 School choice
 Student debt
 Student loan

References

Further reading
 Carl, Jim. Freedom of Choice: Vouchers in American Education. (Westport: Praeger, 2011), 264 pp.
 
 Dennis Epple, Richard E. Romano, and Miguel Urquiola. "School Vouchers: A Survey of the Economics". Journal of Economic Literature. Jun 2017, Vol. 55, No. 2: Pages 441-492
 
  - Hosted by the Education Resources Information Center (ERIC)
 

Alternative education
Education issues
Education economics
Fiscal policy